I'm Not a Fan, But the Kids Like It! is the debut album by American crunkcore group Brokencyde.

Reception

Commercial performance

The album debuted at number 86 on the Billboard 200, with over 6,000 copies sold in the first week.

Critical reception
An NME writer stated, "even if I caught Prince Harry and Gary Glitter adorned in Nazi regalia defecating through my grandmother's letterbox I would still consider making them listen to this album too severe a punishment." Kerrang! said that "I'm Not a Fan... boasts a self-aware title, but that's where all trace of intelligence ends."  AllMusic's review stated that, although the album displays an "irresponsible attitude toward drinking, women, and songwriting", it also boasts "silly energy" and "some great ideas conceived in a high-school hallway."

Track listing

Personnel
Brokencyde
Se7en – rap vocals, screamed vocals
 Mikl – sung vocals
Phat J – vocals, growled vocals, keyboards, synthesizers, programming
Antz – backing vocals, programming

Production
Produced by Mike Kumagai and Se7en, except for "Scene Girls", "40 Oz.", and "Yellow Bus" which are produced by Tristan Krause
Executive production by Brad Baker and Kevin Zinger
Mastered by Tom Baker
Art direction and design by Casey Quintal

Chart performance

References

2009 debut albums
Brokencyde albums
Suburban Noize Records albums